Calliostoma nanshaense is a species of sea snail, a marine gastropod mollusk in the family Calliostomatidae.

Distribution
This species occurs off the Zhujiang Estuary, Guanzhou, China

References

External links
 To Encyclopedia of Life
 To World Register of Marine Species

nanshaense
Gastropods described in 2002